Gattendorf is a municipality in Upper Franconia in the district of Hof in Bavaria, Germany.

Its distinctive swan coat-of-arms was adopted in 1974 following the extinction, in 1944, of the local noble family von Schmidt auf Altenstadt.

References

Hof (district)